Lepinotus inquilinus is a species of granary booklouse in the family Trogiidae. It is found in Africa, Australia, Europe and Northern Asia (excluding China), Central America, North America, Oceania, and Southern Asia.

References

External links

 

Trogiidae
Articles created by Qbugbot
Insects described in 1850